Panayiotou (Παναγιώτου; also transcribed as Panagiotou) is a surname of Greek origin.

 Andreas Panayiotou (born 1966), Cypriot footballer
 Emilios Panayiotou (born 1992), Cypriot footballer
 Georgios Kyriacos Panayiotou, real name of George Michael (1963–2016), English singer and songwriter
 Joshua Panagiotou (born 1984), Canadian actor
 Harry Panayiotou (born 1994), Saint Kitts and Nevis footballer
 Laura Panayiotou, British tailor and costumier
 Melanie Panayiotou (born 1984), Australian marathon runner
 Nicos Panayiotou (born 1970), Cypriot footballer
 Panayiotis Panayiotou (born 1988), Cypriot footballer

 See also

 Panayiotou v Sony Music Entertainment (UK) Ltd

Greek-language surnames
Surnames